Deep Grace Ekka (born 3 June 1994) is an Indian female field hockey player. She plays for the Indian Women's Hockey Team. She has been selected for Arjun award in 2022.

Early life
Deep Grace Ekka was born on 3 June 1994 in a small village called Lulkidhi in the Sundergarh district of Odisha. She is the daughter of Charles and Jayamani Ekka.

She started playing hockey in school and was coached by Tej Kumar Xess (2005–06). During a round of hockey selections at her school, she was selected to join the SAI-SAG centre of the Sports Authority of India in September 2007 and started playing at state level at the age of 13. She began to be coached by Lucela Ekka and Saroj Mohanty. At the age of 16, she played at the senior nationals in Sonepat.

In 2011, she played at the National Games in Ranchi. She was also selected for the Junior National Camp and travelled to Bangkok for the Junior Asia Cup.

She started as a defender, but her desire was to become a goalkeeper as her brother and she used to play sometimes but her uncle, who was her coach, did not allow her to pursue or practise as a goalkeeper, so having no choice she became a defender.

Career
 She has 150 international caps and has scored 3 international goals.

International
 She doubles up drag flicker defending and winning performances at the 9th women Asia cup in japan last year.
 Indian Hockey second match at Gold Coast 2018 against Malaysia in Commonwealth Games completed 150 international cabs.
 Made her international debut in the Four-Nation Tournament in Argentina in 2011 in which India won Bronze medal.
 Helped India win the bronze medal in the U-18 Girls` Asia Cup Hockey Championship at Bangkok, Thailand in 2011.
 Represented Indian senior women`s team in the FIH World League (Round 2) held at New Delhi from 18 to 24 February 2013.
 She was a part of the Indian team that made history by winning the bronze medal for the first time in Women Junior Hockey World Cup at Monchengladbach in Germany on 4 July 2013.
 She was part of the Indian team that won the bronze medal in the Women's Hockey Asia Cup in 2013.
 She was part of the senior Indian team that won the silver medal in the Women's Asian Champions Trophy in 2013.
 She was a member of the Indian team that won the women's hockey test series 6–0 against Malaysia held at Kualalumpur from 9 to 17 June 2014.
 She was part of the Indian women team that finished fifth in the 20th Commonwealth Games, held in Glasgow from 23 July to 3 August 2014.
 She was a member of the Indian women hockey team that won the bronze medal in the 17th Asian Games at Incheon (South Korea) on 1 October 2014.
 She was a member of the Indian women team that finished seventh in the Hawkes Bay Cup Tournament, held at Hastings in New Zealand from 11 to 19 April 2015.
 She was part of the Indian team that won the FIH World League Round 2 in New Delhi in 2015.
 She was a member of Indian women hockey team that won five matches, drew one and lost two on its South Africa tour, which took place from 20 February to 1 March 2016.
 She was a member of the India team that finished sixth in the Hawkes Bay Cup Women Hockey Festival, held at Hastings in New Zealand from 2 to 10 April 2016.
 Completed her 100th international cap in India's final group stage match against Australia on her 22nd birthday at the FourNation Women Tournament at Darwin in Australia on 3 June 2016.
 She was selected for Rio Olympics 2016, Brazil.

National
 Helped Odisha win the title in National School (U-17) Hockey Championship in 2009.
 Helped Odisha finish runners-up in the Hockey event of the Women's National Sports Festival at Bhopal in 2010.
 She was a member of the Odisha team that finished 3rd in the inaugural Hockey India Senior National Championship at Sonepat in 2011.
 Represented Odisha in 34th National games at Ranchi (Jharkhand) in 2011.
 Selected by Hockey India to join the Senior National Women coaching camp to be held at Major Dhyan Chand National Stadiumin New Delhi from 27 December to 15 February 2011.

Award 

 Arjun award, 2022

Other information
 On 26 July 2016, Chief Minister Naveen Patnaik directed Odisha Mining Corporation to provide her a special incentive of Rs 10 lakh for participation in Rio Olympic Games.
 Odisha government on 10 October 2014 announced a cash award of Rs 75,000 lakh for Deep Grace for helping India win women`s bronze medal in the 17th Asian Games at Incheon.
 Odisha Cricket Association on 2 October 2014 announced a cash award of Rs 10,000 for Deep Grace for helping India win the bronze medal in the 17th Asian Games at Incheon.
 On 11 August 2014, Mahanadi Coalfields Limited felicitated with a cash award of Rs 1 lakh for helping India win bronze medal in the 2013 Junior Women HockeyWorld Cup in Germany.

References

External links

Deep Grace Ekka at Hockey India

1994 births
Living people
People from Sundergarh district
Indian female field hockey players
21st-century Indian women
21st-century Indian people
Asian Games medalists in field hockey
Asian Games silver medalists for India
Asian Games bronze medalists for India
Female field hockey defenders
Field hockey players at the 2014 Asian Games
Field hockey players at the 2016 Summer Olympics
Field hockey players at the 2020 Summer Olympics
Field hockey players at the 2018 Asian Games
Field hockey players from Odisha
Medalists at the 2014 Asian Games
Medalists at the 2018 Asian Games
Olympic field hockey players of India
Sportswomen from Odisha
Field hockey players at the 2014 Commonwealth Games
Field hockey players at the 2018 Commonwealth Games
Field hockey players at the 2022 Commonwealth Games
Commonwealth Games bronze medallists for India
Commonwealth Games medallists in field hockey
Recipients of the Arjuna Award
Medallists at the 2022 Commonwealth Games